Sarmentose is a hexose monosaccharide with the molecular formula C7H14O4, obtained from sarmentocymarin by hydrolysis. It is stereoisomeric with cymarose, and closely related to digitalose, which is obtained by hydrolysis of digitalin.

References

Aldohexoses
Deoxy sugars